Sacred Heart National Secondary School, commonly known as Sacred Heart Secondary School, or Sacred Heart School (SHS), is a missionary secondary school in Sibu, a town in an East Malaysia state, Sarawak.

History

The school under the Catholic Mission (1902-1953)
In 1902, the school was founded by Father A. Hopfgartner, born on 5 January 1874, suffered a stroke and died on 15 May 1949. A clock tower and bronze plaque were erected in his memory on the school premises. The school was moved a two storied building at Lanand Road by 1905. The lower floor was used as classrooms, and the upper floor is used as hostels. In 1907, the school was transferred to Mission Road. The following year Father Hopfgarther was replaced by Father Vincent Halder, the longest serving principal of the school. In 1928, Standard Four (now Primary Six) was introduced followed by the introduction of Standard Five (now Form One) in the next year. The school has classes up to Standard Seven (now Form Three) and the number of pupils had reached 300. In Father Halder's final year as Principal, Chinese was added to the school curriculum and a Chinese department was added. After his death, Father Halder was succeeded by Rev. John Vos, who was succeeded by Rev. James Buis in 1938.

Japanese Occupation during World War II
From 1941 to 1946, the school ended its classes because of the Japanese Occupation during the World War II. Half of the School was destroyed by the bomb raid of the Australian Forces.

Post World War II
When the school was reopened in 1947, Rev. Fr. John Dekker took over as Principal and SRB Sacred Heart Chinese was founded. By 1948, the enrollment for the school had increased to 600 students. The school was divided into two parts, the English stream and the Chinese stream. In 1953, the girls were separated from the boys and were moved to another school which was built for them (St. Elizabeth Secondary School).

The school under de La Salle Brothers (1954-1987)
The de La Salle Brothers took control of the school by 1954. Bro. Fridolin became the principal. The First Cambridge School Certificate was held (now Form Five). English was taught in the morning and Chinese was taught in the afternoon. The school became an aided school in 1956. SRB Sacred Heart, a primary school, was founded and Bro. Austin became its first Headmaster. Assembly Hall, Science Labs and Workshops were built in the following years. Marist Brothers took control of the Chinese stream school by 1960. Chinese Junior Section has become a part of the school and Malay Language was introduced. First Cambridge Higher School Certificate was opened. The school was moved to Oya Road in 1967. Lower 6 classes were introduced after Bro. Albinus took over as the principal. The school was renovated and library, canteen, Administration Block and Science Labs were built.

The school under home-grown administrators (1987-present)

In 1987, Mr. Samuel Tan Yang Pheng became the first Malaysian principal of the school. Malay Language completely became the medium of instruction of the school and a new administrative building was built. A single-storey building was built for Form 6 classes in 1998.

Source:

Motto

See also
 Education in Malaysia
 List of schools in Sarawak
 Secondary school

References

External links
 

National secondary schools in Malaysia
Secondary schools in Sarawak
Lasallian schools in Malaysia
Catholic schools in Malaysia
Boys' schools in Malaysia